Metro Parent Publishing Group is a Ferndale, Mich.-based company that produces family-focused publications, Web content, events and television segments. Its specific target audience is the southeast Michigan region, including the Detroit and Ann Arbor metropolitan areas. The group is a member of the Parenting Publications of America.

Metro Parent, the group's award-winning flagship magazine, is published monthly. MetroParent.com, its Web presence, features unique weekly content. Its annual, local events are the “Camp and Activities Fair,” “CoverKids Search,” “Education Expo” and “Native American Festival and Mini Pow Wow.” Its weekly television segment, “Parent Coach,” appears on the local WDIV-TV station. The group also publishes four bi-annual ancillaries – Metro Baby, Dr. Mom, Going Places and Party Book – along with African American Family Magazine, a lifestyle magazine geared at metro Detroit's African American community. The correlating “African American Family Magazine Distinguished Speaker Series” features noteworthy individuals throughout the year.

History
Metro Parent Publishing Group was founded by Alyssa Martina – a metro-Detroit native, attorney, mother of two boys, and certified parent coach – at her dining room table in 1986. The publication originally was called All Kids Considered and, at the time, it was one of only four parenting publications in the country. From those modest beginnings, the company now includes about 25 employees, including editorial, design, sales and events staffing. It purchased its own office in Ferndale in 2005, after years of renting space. It remains a privately owned and operated company, with Martina serving as CEO, publisher and president.

Publications
Metro Parent is a free-of-charge, monthly magazine available in southeast Michigan. Its “Metro Detroit” edition is distributed throughout Macomb, Oakland and Wayne counties, while its “Washtenaw/Livingston” edition is zoned for Washtenaw and Livingston counties. Aimed at parents with kids ages baby through teen, it includes various columns, feature articles, and a “Family Fun Guide” calendar of local events. Special-focus issues include: “Education Guide” in February, “Guide to Camps” in March, “Back to School” in August, and a “Holiday ‘It’ List” gift guide in December. It has won various awards for editorial content and design from the Parenting Publications of America, a national trade association of regional parenting publications across the United States and around the globe.

Metro Baby is an ancillary publication that is published twice a year: once in May (spring/summer edition) and once in November (fall/winter edition). It includes various columns, features and product reviews covering “pre-natal to preschool” topics.

Going Places is an ancillary publication that is published twice a year: once in April (spring/summer edition) and once in October (fall/winter edition). It includes listings of various seasonal and year-round attractions throughout southeast Michigan, such as museums, entertainment, nature/outdoor destinations, sports, fairs and festivals, zoos, water parks, ice rinks and more.

Dr. Mom’s Special Edition is an ancillary publication that appears inside of Metro Parent two times per year: once in April (spring/summer edition) and once in October (fall/winter edition). It focuses on special needs issues that are relevant to families, such as learning disabilities, allergies, autism and ADHD.

Party Book is an advertorial ancillary product of Metro Parent that appears inside of the magazine two times per year: once in June (summer edition) and once in January (winter edition). It features various write-ups with party tips and destinations gleaned from local businesses in southeast Michigan.

African American Family is a monthly lifestyle magazine produced by Metro Parent Publishing Group and targeted toward metro Detroit's African American community. Its mission is to address the needs and concerns of Black parents, grandparents, educators and children.

Web site
MetroParent.com is the online-magazine and community element of Metro Parent. Expanding on the magazine, it serves as a hub for parents, offering extra editorial content, details on various Metro Parent Publishing Group events, additional calendar and parent support listings, blogging, discussion boards and photo-sharing capacities. Browsers who sign up to become members receive a bi-weekly e-newsletter with advance details on events and articles, along with the ability to comment on any articles and start a blog or photo album.

Aside from breaking news, exclusive MetroParent.com content includes: “Five Fabulous Finds” product reviews on the fifth day of the month; “10 Questions With …” Q-and-As with local, parenting-related sources on the 10th day of the month; and “20 Things to Do” events and month-specific ideas on the 20th day of the month.

Events
The “Camp and Activities Fair” is a free event of Metro Parent held in February on two days; one day in the Ann Arbor area and the other day in the Detroit area. It gives parents an opportunity to meet local and national representatives of summer programs targeted at kids ages 3–18. Included are: day camps, overnight camps, specialty camps, year-round cultural programs, teen adventures and tours, academic enrichment and summer employment.

The “CoverKids Search” is an annual, two-day competition hosted by Metro Parent and held one weekend in April at Oakland Mall in Troy, Mich. Its mission is to find children ages birth-12 to appear on the cover of the Metro Parent Publishing Group's various publications.

The “Education Expo” is an annual event of Metro Parent held on a Sunday in late September/early October at the Cranbrook Institute of Science in Bloomfield Hills, Mich. It features representatives and information from various local schools, along with enrichment, tutoring and extracurricular programs, financial planners and more. The event, which marked its 12th year in 2007, typically includes free admission to the institute.

The “Native American Festival and Mini Pow Wow” is an annual family-targeted event of Metro Parent held the second Saturday and Sunday of November at the Southfield Pavilion in Southfield, Mich. It is produced in cooperation with the North American Indian Association of Detroit and marked its 15th year in 2007. The event is intended to celebrate and educate about Michigan's three major Native American tribes: the Ojibwe, the Ottawa and the Potawatomi. It includes Native American dancing, storytelling, lifestyle demonstrations, vendors, food and crafts for children.

The “African American Family Magazine Distinguished Speaker Series” is an ongoing event series hosted by African American Family Magazine. Previous keynote speakers have included former president Bill Clinton, “Lost Boy of Sudan” John Bul Dau, poet and actress Maya Angelou, Coretta Scott King and Toni Morrison.

Television segments
Parent Coach is a three-to-five-minute television segment that appears on the local WDIV-TV station most Saturday mornings, during the station's Local 4 News Morning Powercast. Hosted by Alyssa Martina – Metro Parent Publishing Group's publisher, president, CEO, founder and certified parent coach-in-training – it focuses on a variety of parenting-related issues and includes a monthly, family-friendly cooking or craft activity.

External links
Official company Web site
Official company events Web site

References

Companies based in Oakland County, Michigan
Magazine publishing companies of the United States
Publishing companies established in 1986
1986 establishments in Michigan